This is a list of films produced by the Tollywood (Telugu language film industry) based in Hyderabad in the year 1994.

Released films

Highest Grossing Films

Dubbed films

References

1994
Telugu
1994 films
1994 in Indian cinema